Chitkuli Kinnauri is a language spoken in Kinnaur district of Himachal Pradesh, India. It is spoken in two villages in the Sangla division of Kinnaur - specifically in Chitkul and Rakchham villages. The number of speakers as per Ethnologue (data is from a survey) was 1060 in 1998.

References

Languages of Himachal Pradesh
Endangered languages of India
Kinnaur district